The 2016 Monte-Carlo Masters was a tennis tournament for male professional players, played from 10 April through 17 April 2016, on outdoor clay courts. It was the 110th edition of the annual Monte Carlo Masters tournament, sponsored by Rolex for the eighth time. It took place at the Monte Carlo Country Club in Roquebrune-Cap-Martin, France (though billed as Monte Carlo, Monaco).

Points
Because the Monte Carlo Masters is the non-mandatory Masters 1000 event, special rules regarding points distribution are in place. The Monte Carlo Masters counts as one of a player's 500 level tournaments, while distributing Masters 1000 points.

Singles main draw entrants

Seeds

Rankings are as of April 4, 2016

Other entrants
The following players received wildcards into the main draw:
  Marco Cecchinato
  Lucas Pouille
  Andrey Rublev
  Fernando Verdasco

The following players received entry from the qualifying draw:
  Taro Daniel
  Damir Džumhur
  Daniel Gimeno-Traver
  Pierre-Hugues Herbert
  Filip Krajinović
  Stéphane Robert
  Jan-Lennard Struff

The following player received entry as a lucky loser:
  Marcel Granollers

Withdrawals
Before the tournament
  Marin Čilić →replaced by Robin Haase
  Tommy Haas →replaced by  Alexander Zverev
  Martin Kližan →replaced by  Íñigo Cervantes
  Tommy Robredo →replaced by  Adrian Mannarino
  Bernard Tomic →replaced by  Nicolás Almagro
  David Ferrer(late withdrawal) →replaced by  Marcel Granollers

Doubles main draw entrants

Seeds

 Rankings are as of April 4, 2016

Other entrants
The following pairs received wildcards into the doubles main draw:
  Fabio Fognini /  Paolo Lorenzi
  Rafael Nadal /  Fernando Verdasco

Withdrawals
During the tournament
  Fernando Verdasco (calf injury)

Finals

Singles

  Rafael Nadal defeated  Gaël Monfils, 7–5, 5–7, 6–0

Doubles

  Pierre-Hugues Herbert /  Nicolas Mahut defeated  Jamie Murray /  Bruno Soares, 4–6, 6–0, [10–6]

References

External links
 
 Association of Tennis Professionals (ATP) tournament profile